Yuri Alexandrovich Nikolaev (born 16 December 1948, Chisinau) is a Soviet and Russian TV and radio host, actor. He was awarded the title of People's Artist of Russia in 1998, and since 2007 has been a member of the Academy of Russian Television. On 9 May 2007 he was awarded the Order of Friendship via presidential decree, and was awarded the Order of Honour on 14 January 2014 "for his great contribution in the development of national television, radio, print and many years of fruitful activity".

Nikolaev supports the Russian anti-LGBT propaganda law, which prohibits the "propaganda of non-traditional sexual relationships".

References

External links

 Эхо Москвы: Юрий Николаев
 Официальный сайт

1948 births
Actors from Chișinău
Living people
Russian television presenters
Soviet television presenters
Russian male actors
Soviet male actors
Recipients of the Order of Honour (Russia)
People's Artists of Russia
Russian Academy of Theatre Arts alumni
Television people from Chișinău
Winners of the Golden Gramophone Award